Hrishikesh Das Road is a traditional street situated in Sutrapur, Dhaka. Its alternative name is Hrishikesh Das Lane. Its length is 1 km. Include the road, there are many routes as main entryway to Sutrapur. There are several old and traditional structures along the road.

History
Hrishikesh Das was a wealthy banker and businessman of the nineteenth century. He produced bricks, surki and traded lime, wood and coal. He was also a zamindar. He paid for the cost of electric lighting from Municipal Street to Narinda pool. That is why this part of Walter Road is named as Hrishikesh Das Road.

Hrishikesh Das Road is the place of heritage buildings. In 2009, RAJUK published a gazette, through the gazette it declared the road as heritage site for its historical importance.

In 2018, the government wanted to demolish a historic house on the road, but it was stopped by a order from High court.

Architecture

On both sides of Hrishikesh Das Road, there are numerous structures of British period which are more than one hundred years old. These houses have semicircular arches, stained glass windows, herpet-designed parapets, and beautiful porches with metal or wooden pillars. The complete beauty of these buildings cannot be realized from the outside. Many homes have open courtyards that can only be seen through a narrow entrance.

According to the elders, there is a house owned by the family of zamindar from Murapara. Many zamindars, whose zamindari was outside Dhaka, also built houses here. From this, the historical significance of this area can be understood.

There are two old temples named Sriyut Madan Gopal Jiu Vigraha Thakur Temple and Sri Sri Sitanath Jiu Vigraha Temple. However, due to lack of conservation, they are losing their architectural beauty.

The Hayat Bepari Mosque, established in 1664, is located on this street. Hayat Bepari, the builder of Narinda Pool, established the mosque. At present the original form of the mosque is no more. It looks like Binat Bibi Mosque of Narinda and had only one dome.

References

Old Dhaka
Streets in Dhaka